Nicolás Andrés Olmedo (born March 10, 1983) is an Argentine football midfielder.

Club career

Godoy Cruz
Olmedo started his career in 2002 with Godoy Cruz, while the team played in the Primer (regionalized fourth division) on its 2004–05 season.

Upon his return to Godoy Cruz, he won with the team the 2005–06 season of the Primera B Nacional, securing promotion to the Argentine Primera. Olmedo saw little action during Godoy Cruz' subsequent season in the first division (the 2006–07), playing only 12 games and scoring 1 goal. Godoy Cruz was relegated by the end of the season, but the midfielder stayed with the team and helped them return to the first division after only one season.

In his second period in the first division, Olmedo became an integral part of Godoy Cruz' first team. He started in 18 (of a total 19) games for his team's third-place finish in the 2010 Clausura, the best historical campaign by a Mendoza Province based team in the Argentine league.

Barcelona SC

Gustavo Costas signed Nicolas Olmedo to play for Barcelona SC.

International career
In 2010, Olmedo was called to the Argentina national team by coach Diego Maradona to play a friendly match against Haiti, in a squad formed exclusively with players from the Argentine league.

Honours
San Martín de Tucumán
Torneo Argentino B (1): 2004–05

Godoy Cruz
Primera B Nacional (1): 2005–06

References

External links
 
 Argentine Primera statistics at Fútbol XXI  
 Statistics at BDFA 

Living people
1983 births
Association football midfielders
Argentine footballers
Argentina international footballers
Argentine Primera División players
Primera Nacional players
Torneo Federal A players
Ecuadorian Serie A players
Godoy Cruz Antonio Tomba footballers
Gimnasia y Esgrima de Jujuy footballers
San Martín de Tucumán footballers
Barcelona S.C. footballers
Argentinos Juniors footballers
Crucero del Norte footballers
Deportivo Maipú players
Argentine expatriate footballers
Expatriate footballers in Ecuador
Argentine expatriate sportspeople in Ecuador
Sportspeople from Mendoza Province